Dilermando de Aguiar is a municipality in the state of Rio Grande do Sul, Brazil.

Paleontology 
In this city there are outcrops of Sanga do Cabral Formation, the (Railroad abandoned between Dilermando de Aguiar and São Gabriel). Early Triassic age.

See also
List of municipalities in Rio Grande do Sul

References

Municipalities in Rio Grande do Sul